Kearny Junction was a railroad junction in Kearny, New Jersey along the Delaware, Lackawanna and Western Railroad main line. Just west of Kearny Junction, the DL&W Harrison Cut-off to Kingsland joins the DL&W main line.

See also
Kearny Connection
Waterfront Connection
List of New Jersey railroad junctions

References

Kearny, New Jersey
Transportation in Hudson County, New Jersey
Rail infrastructure in New Jersey
Delaware, Lackawanna and Western Railroad
Rail junctions in the United States